"The Handicap Spot" is the 22nd episode of the fourth season and the 62nd overall episode of Seinfeld. It aired on May 13, 1993 on NBC. The episode deals with the numerous misfortunes which befall the characters as a result of their illegally parking in a handicapped space.

Plot
The group travels to a mall in Lynbrook to buy a big-screen television as an engagement gift for their friend "The Drake". George, who has borrowed his father's treasured car, parks in a handicapped parking space after being urged by Kramer to do so since they couldn't find any spaces. When they return, they find an angry mob plotting to attack the vehicle's owner because a disabled woman, who had to park in a distant spot because of their illegal parking, has been injured in a wheelchair accident. After sneaking away, they try to come up with a plan to divert the mob's attention and blame both George and Kramer. They later return to find the car demolished.

George invents a preposterous story about being cut off in traffic to explain the accident. While visiting Lola, the injured handicapped woman, at the hospital, Kramer falls in love and feels compelled to replace her wheelchair. George and Kramer buy a used wheelchair of a cheap model. Jerry and Elaine go to have lunch with The Drake after missing his party and discover that he and his fiancée have broken off their engagement. They are indignant that the former couple are not returning their expensive engagement presents to the givers, believing that this should be common courtesy when an engagement is broken. Discreetly inquiring about the TV, they learn that The Drake let his ex-fiance have all the gifts, and she in turn donated them to charity.

George's father Frank Costanza receives an award for outstanding service in helping the handicapped. In the middle of receiving the award, he is arrested for George's parking in the handicap spot, as Frank is the registered owner of the vehicle. Frank forces him to become his butler as punishment, an idea taken from the pilot episode that George is writing with Jerry.

Lola breaks up with Kramer and later rolls down a hill in the used wheelchair, which she cannot stop due to faulty brakes. George's first job as his father's butler is to retrieve the big-screen TV at The Drake's house, so that it can be donated to charity. George and Kramer retrieve the TV, then reunite with Jerry and Elaine to return it for a refund. When looking for a parking space at the mall, Kramer tries to talk George into parking next to a fire hydrant, using near-identical rationales as he had at the handicapped spot.

Production
This is the first appearance of George's father Frank Costanza, played by John Randolph. After this episode, Randolph was replaced with Jerry Stiller, who would play Frank for the rest of the series. In 1995, the scenes in which Randolph appeared were re-shot with Stiller for the series' syndication in the United States. However, in some syndicated airings, Randolph is still listed in the credits.

References

External links 
 

1993 American television episodes
Seinfeld (season 4) episodes
Television episodes written by Larry David